Miss Earth Canada is a beauty pageant held annually in search of the most beautiful and environmental-friendly woman in Canada. It is the official preliminary to the Miss Earth pageant. The winners are chosen based on physical attributes and skills in speaking in public on environmental matters.

History

2001–2002: Early years
Canada was first represented by Michelle Carrie Lillian Weswaldi in the first edition of the Miss Earth pageant, Miss Earth 2001. In 2002, Canada was represented by Melanie Grace Bennett, of Vancouver, BC. Mixed ethnicity, Melanie is half Caucasian & Half Filipina.

2003–2018: Rosotro Productions
In 2003 the Miss Earth Canada franchise was obtained by Rosotro Productions owned by Ronaldo Soriano Trono, and since 2004, a national contest in Montreal has been held each autumn to determine the winner.

Several winners have held awards in the international Miss Earth pageant. Filipino-Canadian beauty, Riza Santos (Miss Earth Canada 2006) was voted Miss Photogenic and Miss Fontana at the Miss Earth 2006 competition and went on to be a host and star in various movies and television shows in the Philippines. Denise Garrido (Miss Earth Canada 2008) won the "Miss Earth Puerto Princesa" title during a pre-pageant swimsuit competition of Miss Earth 2008 held at the Puerto Princesa Subterranean River National Park. Katherine McClure (Miss Earth Canada 2005) of Toronto was Miss Earth Congeniality in the Miss Earth 2005.Tanya Munizaga (Miss Earth Canada 2004) was Miss Earth Talent at the Miss Earth 2004.

The Miss Earth Canada pageant produced one winner in the international Miss Earth pageant when Jessica Trisko won the Miss Earth 2007 crown. Trisko became the first Canadian to win the Miss Earth title and spent her reign promoting environmental issues. Aside from Canada and the Philippines, she had the chance to travel during her reign to many countries like China, Puerto Rico, and Singapore. She also travelled multiple times to Indonesia, the United States and Vietnam to meet world environmental leaders and to promote environmental awareness and preservation of the mother earth.

2020-present: Miss World Canada Organization
In 2020, Miss World Canada Organization acquired the rights to send a delegate to Miss Earth by the organization's president, Michelle Weswaldi. The organization appointed Denise Gloren Guelos. Laura Pastor, Miss World Canada 4th Runner up was appointed to be the delegate for 2021 but withdrew and replaced by Alice Li.

Titleholders
Color key

The main winner of Miss Earth Canada represents her country at Miss Earth pageant.

See also
Miss Universe Canada
Miss World Canada

References 

Canada
Beauty pageants in Canada
2001 establishments in Quebec
Canadian awards